Chizhovo is a rural locality (a village) in Korobitsynskoye Rural Settlement, Syamzhensky District, Vologda Oblast, Russia. The population was 3 as of 2002.

Geography 
Chizhovo is located 41 km east of Syamzha (the district's administrative centre) by road. Podgornaya is the nearest rural locality.

References 

Rural localities in Syamzhensky District